Abramów is a village in Lubartów County, Lublin Voivodeship, in eastern Poland. It is the seat of the gmina (administrative district) called Gmina Abramów.

In 2005 the village has a population of 713.

References
 Gmina Abramów official website

Villages in Lubartów County